Maharaja Sir Hari Singh  (September 1895 – 26 April 1961) was the last ruling Maharaja of the princely state of Jammu and Kashmir.

Hari Singh was the son of Amar Singh and Bhotiali Chib. In 1923, following his uncle's death, Singh became the new Maharaja of Jammu and Kashmir. After Indian Independence in 1947, Singh wanted Jammu and Kashmir to remain as an independent kingdom. He was required to accede to the Dominion of India to get the support of Indian troops against an invasion by tribal armed men and the Pakistan Army into his state.

Singh remained the titular Maharaja of the state until 1952, when the monarchy was abolished by the Indian government. After spending his final days in Bombay, he died on 26 April 1961.

Singh was also a controversial figure due to his involvement in a blackmail scandal by a prostitute in Paris in 1921, the agitation in Kashmir against his government in 1931, and the rebellion against him in Poonch in 1947.

Early life

Hari Singh was born on September 1895 at the palace of Amar Mahal, Jammu. He was the only surviving son of Raja Amar Singh, the brother of Maharaja Pratap Singh, then the Maharaja of Jammu and Kashmir. Since the Maharaja had no issue, Hari Singh was heir to the throne of Jammu and Kashmir.

In 1903, Hari Singh served as a page of honor to Lord Curzon at the grand Delhi Durbar. At the age of 13, he was sent to Mayo College in Ajmer. A year later, in 1909, his father died and the British took a keen interest in his education, appointing Major H. K. Brar as his guardian. After Mayo College, Hari Singh went to the British-run Imperial Cadet Corps at Dehradun for military training.

He was appointed the commander-in-chief of the State Forces in 1915 by Maharaja Pratap Singh.

Reign

Following the death of his uncle Pratap Singh on 23 September 1925, Hari Singh served as the second Prime Minister (1925-1926) of Jammu and Kashmir. Hari Singh ascended the throne of Jammu and Kashmir in February 1926 only after the British interfered and disputed the nominated king Jagat Dev Singh, a member of Poonch ruling family and a descendant of Gulab Singh’s brother Dhian Singh. Hari Singh's coronation from February 22 to February 28, 1926 was divided into two separate ceremonies - the first few days  for the religious ceremonies and official programme in the latter part was set aside for hosting the European attendees.
After becoming the ruler, Hari Singh conducted free elections and formed the Praja Sabha Jammu and Kashmir Legislative Assembly to rule with laws implemented under Ranbir Penal Code (R.P.C) which Praja Sabha decreed. In April 1932, as per recommendations of the Glancy Commission, the Praja Sabha was established, made up of 75 members – 12 government officials, 16 state councillors, 14 nominated, and 33 elected (21 Muslims, 10 Hindus and 2 Sikhs). By September 1934 the elected members started making laws under the Praja Sabha  which made Jammu and Kashmir a forerunner state for other Princely Indian States.In September 7, 1939 Maharaja Hari Singh and his law and Revenue Minister, Justice Sir Lal Gopal Mukherjee, a former judge of the Allahabad high court (1926-1934) who had served the state of Jammu and Kashmir from 1935 to 1940, produced a written constitution for Jammu and Kashmir which was the "pioneer" in the annals of Asia's constitutional history; despite the fact that it was anything but a people-friendly "Magna Carta" for the state.
He made primary education compulsory in the state, introduced laws prohibiting child marriage, and opened places of worship to low caste subjects.

In 1930, Hari Singh attended the First Round Table Conference in London. He suggested that the Indian Princely states should join an “All India Federation” and pleaded for equal status for Indians in the British Commonwealth of Nations. While replying to the inaugural address by King-Emperor George V, Hari Singh said:

Partition and accession 

In 1947, after India gained independence from British rule, Jammu and Kashmir could have joined India, joined Pakistan, or remained independent. Singh originally maneuvered to maintain his independence by playing off India and Pakistan. Him being an unpopular ruler led to mass anxiety among his Muslim that the Maharaja would accede to India. This led to an armed uprising in Poonch against the Maharaja in the spring of 1947. In retaliation, extremist Hindus and Sikhs in the background of the Partition of India entered the kingdom from Punjab, and along with the state forces, massacred and expelled the Muslims of Jammu in what later came to be known as the 1947 Jammu massacres. Pashtun tribe members from Pakistan then invaded Kashmir and defeated Singh's forces. Hari Singh appealed to India for help. Although the Indian Prime Minister Jawaharlal Nehru was ready to send troops, the Governor-General of India, Lord Mountbatten, advised the Maharaja to accede to India before India could send its troops. Hence, considering the emergency, the Maharaja signed the Instrument of Accession on 26 October 1947, joining the whole of his princely state (including Jammu, Kashmir, Northern Areas, Ladakh, Trans-Karakoram Tract, and Aksai Chin) to the Dominion of India. These events triggered the first Indo-Pakistan War.

Pressure from Prime Minister Jawaharlal Nehru and Deputy Prime Minister Vallabhbhai Patel eventually compelled Singh to appoint his son and heir, Yuvraj (Crown Prince) Karan Singh, as Prince Regent of Jammu and Kashmir in 1949, although he remained the titular Maharaja of the state until 1952 when the monarchy was abolished by Nehru's government. He was also forced to appoint the popular Kashmiri leader Sheikh Abdullah as the prime minister of Kashmir. He had a contentious relationship with both Nehru and Abdullah. Karan Singh was appointed 'Sadr-e-Riyasat' ('Head of State') in 1952 and Governor of the State in 1964. Abdullah would later be dismissed from his position as prime minister of Kashmir and jailed by Karan Singh.

Final years and death

After signing the instrument of accession with India, Hari Singh was banished from Jammu and Kashmir which made him spend his last years in Bombay. Singh spent his final days in Bombay. He died on 26 April 1961, after fourteen years of banishment.

Legacy and memorials

Tributes and memorials

 In 2007, Chief Minister Ghulam Nabi Azad inaugurated the 'Hari Singh Janana Park' for women. It is landscaped by the Gardens and Floriculture Department at New Secretariat.
 On 1 April 2012, the occasion of Ram Navami, Union Minister Ghulam Nabi Azad and MP Karan Singh unveiled a statue of Hari Singh near the Tawi bridge in Jammu. 
 Sh Kavinder Gupta Mayor of Jammu Municipal Corporation erected a statue of Maharaja Hari Singh in standing posture near Bagh-e-Bahu Police Station adjoining junction crossings linking Gujjar Nagar Tawi Bridge, Jammu University, Bagh-e-Bahu, Narwal
 On 16 May 2018, Chief Minister Mehbooba Mufti along with Deputy Chief Minister Dr Nirmal Singh inaugurated 'Maharaja Hari Singh Park' wherein statue of Maharaja Hari Singh in sitting posture is the main attraction of this park.
 On 23 September 2019, the Amar Kshatriya Rajput Sabha (AKRS) installed a life-sized statue of Hari Singh on his 119th birthday at Samba district, near Veer Bhoomi Park.
 On 23 September 2020, an audio-video song album in Dogri was released highlighting social reforms introduced by Hari Singh from 1930 onwards.
 On 23 September 2021, Sh Ravinder Raina BJP Jammu President unveiled a statue of Hari Singh at Dr. Syama Prasad Mukherjee Bhawan, Sec. 3 Extn, Trikuta Nagar, Jammu, Jammu & Kashmir, the party headquarters.
 23 September 2022 is declared as public holiday on the birth anniversary of Maharaja Hari Singh under Negotiable Instrument Act, 1881 (Central Act 26 of 1881) across Union territory of Jammu and Kashmir.

Personal life

Blackmail case
In 1921, Singh paid £300,000 (approximately £ in today's value) to a prostitute who blackmailed him. The issue resulted in a court case in London in 1924 during which the India Office tried to keep his name out of proceedings by arranging for him to be referred to as Mr. A. India Office in Britain decided to close the files for a hundred years rather than the usual thirty years as the case involved espionage.

Personal wealth
Hari Singh was known as a lavish spender of money. In the funeral of his uncle and former ruler, Pratap Singh, he is believed to have spent excessive gold and jewelry in the funeral pyre.

Marriages

Singh married four times as his first three wives failed to give birth to his heirs. Each of them died within a few years of childlessness, allowing Singh to immediately take a new bride. With his last wife, Tara Devi Sahiba of Kangra, he had a son, Karan Singh.

Titles and honours

Title and style

As Maharaja, Hari Singh's full style was:

Honours

 1903:  Delhi Durbar Medal
 1911:  Delhi Durbar Medal
 1922: Prince of Wales Visit Medal
 1929:  Knight Grand Commander of the Order of the Indian Empire (GCIE) (KCIE in 1918)
 1930:  Grand Cross of the Order of the Crown of Italy
 1933:  Knight Grand Commander of the Order of the Star of India (GCSI)
 1935:  King George V Silver Jubilee Medal
 1937:  King George VI Coronation Medal
 1938:  Grand Officer of the Legion d'Honneur
 1945:  1939-1945 Star
 1945:  Africa Star
 1945:  War Medal 1939-1945
 1945:  India Service Medal
 1946:  Knight Grand Cross of the Royal Victorian Order (GCVO) (KCVO in 1922)
 1948:  Indian Independence Medal

Honorary degrees

 1938: Hon. LL.D from Punjab University

References

Bibliography

External links

 Proclamation of 1 May 1951 on Jammu & Kashmir Constituent Assembly by Yuvraj (Crown Prince) Karan Singh (Son of Maharajah Hari Singh) from the Official website of Government of Jammu and Kashmir, India
 Conflict in Kashmir: Selected Internet Resources by the Library, University of California, Berkeley, USA; University of California at Berkeley Library Bibliographies and Web-Bibliographies list
  The role of Shri Guruji Golwalkar (Sarsanghchalak of the Rashtriya Swayamsevak Sangh – RSS)
 Nehru, Abdullah betrayed Maharaja Hari Singh
 Banished from his own land

Dethroned monarchs
Rajput rulers
Knights Grand Commander of the Order of the Star of India
Knights Grand Commander of the Order of the Indian Empire
Indian Knights Grand Cross of the Royal Victorian Order
1895 births
1961 deaths
Maharajas of Jammu and Kashmir
Indian Hindus
Dogra people
Hindu monarchs
20th-century Indian royalty